The Writers Guild of America West (WGAW) is a labor union representing film, television, radio, and new media writers. It was formed in 1954 from five organizations representing writers, including the Screen Writers Guild. It has around 20,000 members.

History

The Screen Writers Guild (SWG) was formed in 1921 by a group of ten screenwriters in Hollywood angered over wage reductions announced by the major film studios. The group affiliated with the Authors Guild in 1933 and began representing TV writers in 1948. In 1954, the SWG was one of five groups who merged to represent professional writers on both coasts and became the Writers Guild of America, East (WGAe) and West (WGAw). Howard J. Green and John Howard Lawson were the first two presidents during the SWG era. Daniel Taradash was president of the WGAw from 1977 to 1979.

In 1952, the Guild authorized movie studios to delete onscreen credits for any writers who had not been cleared by Congress, as part of the industry's blacklisting of writers with alleged Communist or leftist leanings or affiliations.

From March to August 1988, WGAw members were on strike against the major American television networks in a dispute over residuals from repeat airings and foreign/home video use of scripted shows and made-for-TV movies. The 22-week strike crippled American broadcast television and drove millions of viewers, disgusted with the lack of new scripted programming, to cable channels and home video, a blow to ratings and revenues from which, some industry watchers argue, the networks have never fully recovered.

In 2004, Victoria Riskin resigned as WGAw President after being accused by her opponent Eric Hughes during the 2003 election of using a sham writing contract to maintain her membership status. She was replaced by vice-president Charles Holland, who resigned a few weeks later when questions arose about statements he had made about his college football career and his claim of having secretly served in combat as a Green Beret, a claim his army records did not support. After Riskin's resignation, the U.S. Department of Labor investigated the sham contract and concluded that Riskin was indeed ineligible to run. The WGAw entered into a settlement by offering to re-run the election under DOL supervision. A new election was held in September 2004 between Eric Hughes and Daniel Petrie, Jr. which Petrie won.

On April 17, 2019, WGA West and WGA East filed a lawsuit in Los Angeles Superior Court against the four dominant Hollywood talent agencies, William Morris Agency, Creative Artists Agency, United Talent Agency and ICM Partners, citing movie packaging fee practices, which the WGA asserts are a violation of state and federal laws. Approximately 95 percent of Guild members voted "in favor of a code of conduct that would cease packaging fees."

During the week following its lawsuit filing; en masse, over 7,000 Guild members fired their talent agents, as "not just drastically out-earning them, but preventing them from receiving better pay." WGA president David A. Goodman was then quoted as stating to NPR "that in a period of unprecedented profits and growth of our business ... writers themselves are actually earning less".

Reality united
In June 2005, WGAw started a "reality rights" campaign to allow writers of reality television shows to qualify for guild rights and benefits. The union maintained that the storytellers who conceive the tests and confrontations on such shows were bona fide writers. The Guild also expressed concern the 1988 strike showed that lack of representation in the genre would weaken their future bargaining position. Studio executives maintained that these employees were primarily editors, not writers, and that the shows needed to appear to be unscripted in order for viewers to feel they were "real."

As part of this campaign, on September 20, 2006, the WGAw held a Los Angeles unity rally in support of the America's Next Top Model writers' strike. President Patric Verrone said, "Every piece of media with a moving image on a screen or a recorded voice must have a writer, and every writer must have a WGA contract."

On November 6, 2006, the WGAw filed an unfair labor practice complaint with the National Labor Relations Board after Top Model producers said the show's next season would be produced using a new system that would not require writers. In response, Verrone said, "as they demanded union representation, the company decided they were expendable. This is illegal strikebreaking."

2007–08 strike

On November 2, 2007, the Guild again went on strike, this time over writers' share of revenues from DVD releases and from Internet, cellphone shows, and other new media uses of programs and films written by members. The strike vote followed the expiration of the guild's contract with the Alliance of Motion Picture and Television Producers.

Governance
The WGAw is governed by its membership. Elections for a board of directors are held annually by secret mail-in ballot. Half of the board is elected each year to a two-year term of office, and a board member may not serve more than four consecutive terms. In 2022 the officers are:

 President: Meredith Stiehm
 Vice President: Michele Mulroney
 Secretary-Treasurer: Betsy Thomas
 Board of Directors: Liz Hsiao Lan Alper, Raphael Bob-Waksberg, Angelina Burnett, Robb Chavis, Adam Conover, Marjorie David, Travis Donnelly, Ashley Gable, Justin Halpern, Dante W. Harper, Eric Haywood, Deric A. Hughes, Zoe Marshall, Dailyn Rodriguez, John Rogers, and Nicole Yorkin.

David Young is employed as the Guild's executive director and Tony Segall is general counsel. Young served as the Guild's chief negotiator during the 2007 contract negotiations and subsequent 100-day strike.

According to WGAw's Department of Labor records since 2006, over half of the guild's total membership is ineligible to vote, comprising the guild's "post current," "emeritus," and "associate" members.

Magazine
Written By, the WGAw's official journal, since 1997, is published six times a year, which it describes as "the magazine of America's Storytellers",.

Writers Guild Theater
Writers Guild Theater, on South Doheny Drive, in Beverly Hills, is a  473-seat theater, with 2,000 square feet of "flexible space".

See also

 Writers Guild of America, East (WGAE)
 International Affiliation of Writers Guilds (IAWG)
 Writers Guild of America Award
 1960 Writers Guild of America strike
 1988 Writers Guild of America strike
 2007–08 Writers Guild of America strike
 Effect of the 2007–08 Writers Guild of America strike on television
 WGA screenwriting credit system
 WGA script registration service

References

External links
 
 WGAw Registry (wgawregistry.org)
 List of the 101 Greatest Screenplays
 101 Best Written TV Series List
 Producer Writers Guild of America Pension & Health Funds
 WGAw Reality TV organizing committee
 Writer Action a BBS for Guild Members
 Screen Rights

Scriptwriters' trade unions
International Affiliation of Writers Guilds
Trade unions established in 1921
Trade unions in the United States
 
American writers' organizations
1921 establishments in California